Chip Hooper (born October 24, 1958) is a former tennis player from the United States, who won five doubles titles during his professional career.

The right-handed Hooper reached his highest ATP singles ranking of World No. 17 in April 1982

Hooper played collegiately at Memphis State University (now University of Memphis) and the University of Arkansas

Currently, he is working as a private tennis coach in Miami with professional players like Jelena Janković.

Grand Prix career finals

Singles (2 runner-ups)

Doubles (5 titles, 5 runner-ups)

External links
 
 

1958 births
Living people
African-American male tennis players
American male tennis players
Arkansas Razorbacks men's tennis players
Tennis people from Washington, D.C.
21st-century African-American people
20th-century African-American sportspeople
Tennis players from Washington, D.C.
Sports coaches from Washington, D.C.
Memphis Tigers men's tennis players